CBF may refer to:

Aviation
 Council Bluffs Municipal Airport (IATA: CBF)
 China Northern Airlines (ICAO: CBF)

Organisations
 Catholic Biblical Federation, a Roman Catholic Church organization for biblical translation and worldwide distribution 
 Central British Fund for German Jewry, the original name of World Jewish Relief
 Chesapeake Bay Foundation, a conservation organization dedicated to the restoration and protection of the Chesapeake Bay and its tributary rivers
 Community Broadcasting Foundation, a funding organisation in Australia
 Cooperative Baptist Fellowship

Radio stations in Canada
 CBF-FM, a French-language Canadian radio station in Montreal, Quebec
 CBF-4, a transmitter of CHLM-FM in Matagami, Quebec
 CBF-FM-8, a French-language Canadian radio station in Trois-Rivières, Quebec
 CBF-FM-10, a French-language Canadian radio station in Sherbrooke, Quebec

Science and medicine
 Cerebral blood flow, the blood supply to the brain in a given period of time
 Ciliary beat frequency; see Cilium
 Core binding factor, a type of transcription factor
 C-Repeat Binding Factor, transcription factors in plants

Sport and games
 Brazilian Football Confederation (Confederação Brasileira de Futebol), national governing body for football (soccer) in Brazil
 Cambodian Basketball Federation, the governing body for the Cambodia national basketball team
 Canadian Bridge Federation, the governing body for contract bridge in Canada
 ChessBase format, for storing chess games in handheld computer memory
 China Bandy Federation, the governing body for bandy in China
 College Baseball Foundation, Lubbock, Texas, U.S.
 Cyprus Basketball Federation, the governing body for basketball on the island of Cyprus
 Czech Basketball Federation (ČBF), the governing body of basketball in the Czech Republic

Other uses
 Commander British Forces in Hong Kong (1843–1997), a senior British Army officer
 Honda CBF series, a series of motorcycles
 "C.B.F (Chrome Black Future)", a Nevermore song from the 1995 album Nevermore